Agustín Ramírez may refer to:

 Agustín Ramírez (footballer) (born 2000), Argentine footballer
 Agustín Ramírez (singer) (1952–2022), Mexican singer